Cleostratus is a lunar impact crater near the northwest limb of the Moon. It lies to the northeast of the crater Xenophanes, and west-southwest of the prominent Pythagoras. From the Earth this crater appears highly elongated due to foreshortening.

The rim of this crater has become soft-shouldered due to steady impact erosion, and the formation is now just a depression in the surface surrounded by an eroded rise. A pair of small craters lie across the southwest rim, forming part of a short chain of craters leading to the west. Along the crest of the southern rim is a linear ridge. The satellite crater Cleostratus E is attached to the northwest rim, and intrudes slightly into the inner wall. The interior floor of this crater is flat and nearly featureless, having only a few tiny craterlets marking the surface.

Satellite craters
By convention these features are identified on lunar maps by placing the letter on the side of the crater midpoint that is closest to Cleostratus.

References

 
 
 
 
 
 
 
 
 
 
 
 

Impact craters on the Moon